Kefamenanu is a town and capital of the administrative district (kecamatan) of Kota Kefamenanu and of the North Central Timor Regency in West Timor, Indonesia. A road connects it to Halilulik and Kota Atambua to the northeast. It had a population of 43,058 at the 2010 Census and 47,766 at the 2020 Census; the official estimate in mid 2021 was 48,202. The town hosts the University of Timor, one of the two public universities on the island.

Climate
Kefamenanu has a tropical savanna climate (Aw) with moderate to little rainfall from April to November and heavy rainfall from December to March.

References

Populated places in East Nusa Tenggara
Regency seats of East Nusa Tenggara
West Timor